This section of the Timeline of United States history includes major events from 2010 to the present.

2010s

Presidency of Barack Obama

2010 – The Deepwater Horizon oil rig in the Gulf of Mexico explodes, spilling millions of gallons of oil into the sea.  The spill becomes the worst oil spill in American history.
2010 – In the 2010 Midterm elections, the Republicans retake the House of Representatives as the Democrats lose 63 seats.
2011 – U.S. Representative Gabrielle Giffords is severely wounded in an assassination attempt when a gunman went on a shooting spree, killing federal judge John Roll and five other people, and wounding at least 13 others, at an event Giffords was hosting in suburban Tucson, Arizona.
2011 – The ATF gunwalking scandal emerged, wherein thousands of guns were allowed to "walk" through interdiction to Mexico, supposedly to aid in the capture of criminals.
2011 – A series of tornadoes cause heavy damage in the South, Alabama being the hardest hit. 324 people are killed in the deadliest American natural disaster since Hurricane Katrina.
2011 – Osama bin Laden, leader of al-Qaeda and mastermind of the September 11 attacks, is killed in Abbottabad, Pakistan, by U.S. Navy SEALs.
2011 – Flooding devastates the Mississippi River valley causing $2 to $4 billion in damage.
2011 – A tornado devastates Joplin, Missouri, killing 158 and injuring over 1,000, making it the deadliest single U.S. tornado since the advent of modern weather forecasting
2011 – Casey Marie Anthony is acquitted of all charges related to her death of her daughter, Caylee; she was convicted of four counts of providing false information to a law enforcement officer. She was released a week later because of credit for time served.
2011 – STS-135: The Space Shuttle Atlantis touches down at the Shuttle Landing Facility at Kennedy Space Center, ending the 30-year shuttle program, which began with the launch of Space Shuttle Columbia on April 12, 1981.
2012 – A gunman kills 12 and injures 70 at a movie theater in Aurora, Colorado.
2012 – U.S. presidential election, 2012: Barack Obama reelected president, Joe Biden reelected Vice President.
2012 – A gunman kills 26, including 20 children, at the Sandy Hook Elementary School in Newtown, Connecticut.
2012 – Hurricane Sandy strikes the Eastern Seaboard.
2013 – President Obama and Vice President Biden begin their second terms.
2013 – Christopher Dorner murders three people in Southern California, starting the largest manhunt in Los Angeles history. His spree ends in Big Bear Lake, California where he barricades himself in a cabin, kills a second officer, before committing suicide.
2013 – Edward Snowden leaks highly classified documents from the National Security Agency.
2013 – Terrorists attack the Boston Marathon by detonating two bombs at the finishing line of the race, killing three and injuring 283 runners and spectators. Suspects Tamerlan and Dzhokhar Tsarnaev then led Boston police on a high-speed chase, killing one officer at the Massachusetts Institute of Technology. Tamerlan was killed in a shootout with police and Dzhokhar was detained the day after.
2013 – A tornado devastates suburbs near Oklahoma City, killing 24.
2013 – The most destructive wildfire in Colorado history burns nearly 16,000 acres and kills two people.
2013 – The Supreme Court strikes down the Defense of Marriage Act, which banned the federal recognition of same-sex marriages and refused to recognize the legal standing of proponents of Proposition 8, which resulted in the re-legalization of same-sex marriage in California.
2013 – Black Lives Matter emerges as a political movement, protesting against widespread racial profiling, police brutality, and racial inequality in the United States criminal justice system.
2014 – A grand jury decides not to charge Officer Darren Wilson in the shooting death of Michael Brown inciting protests and riots against racism and police brutality in the St. Louis area Causing riot.
2014 – The Republicans win the Senate in the Midterm elections. 
2015 – Dzhokhar Tsarnaev is convicted and sentenced to death for committing the Boston Marathon bombing.
2015 – Dylann Roof kills 9 people during a Bible study at the Emanuel African Methodist Episcopal Church  in Charleston, South Carolina.
2015 – Following Obergefell v. Hodges, same-sex marriage is legalized nationwide.
2015 – Rizwan Farook and Tashfeen Malik carried out an attack at the Inland Regional Center in San Bernardino, California, killing 14 and seriously injuring 22 others.
2016 – Omar Mateen kills 49 people and injures 53 members of the LGBT community at the Pulse nightclub.
2016 – U.S. presidential election, 2016: Donald Trump elected president, Mike Pence elected Vice President.
2016 – 36 people are killed in the Oakland Warehouse Fire.
2017 – Fort Lauderdale airport shooting.

Presidency of Donald Trump

2017 – Donald Trump becomes the 45th president, Mike Pence becomes Vice President. Trump is the first person without prior military or government service to hold the office.
2017 – Trump fires FBI director James Comey, precipitating the Mueller investigation.
2017 – Relations between the U.S. and the U.N. and North Korea strain after the country tested missiles in various places.
April 2017 – The United States drops missiles and bombs on Syria.
2017 – A white supremacist rally in Charlottesville, Virginia leads to three deaths and to the discussion about racism in modern American society. The term alt-right receives renewed popular consciousness.
2017 – Hurricane Harvey makes landfall in the United States, flooding broad swaths of Texas and Louisiana and causing tens of billions of dollars of damage, making it one of the costliest natural disasters in U.S. history.
2017 – Hurricane Irma makes landfall in Florida and causes tens of billions of dollars of damage. Irma also wrecks the Caribbean Islands.
2017 – Hurricane Maria made landfall on Puerto Rico as a Category 5 hurricane, killing hundreds and knocking out the island's power. 
October 1, 2017 – A gunman opens fire at a Las Vegas Strip concert, killing 60 people and injuring 867. This was the deadliest mass shooting in modern U.S. history.
November 5, 2017 – A gunman kills 26 people and wounds 22 others at a church in Sutherland Springs, Texas, before killing himself. This was the deadliest mass shooting in Texas history and the deadliest shooting in an American place of worship in modern history.
2017 – Film producer Harvey Weinstein is accused of sexual harassment in a New York Times expose, marking the beginning of the Me Too movement.
February 14, 2018 – A gunman kills 17 people and injures 17 at Marjory Stoneman Douglas High School in Parkland, Florida.
2018 – Donald Trump meets with North Korean leader Kim Jong-un in Singapore.
2018 – The entire West Virginia Supreme Court of Appeals is impeached.
2018 – In the 2018 United States elections, the Democrats retake the House while the Republicans keep the Senate.
2018 – Creator of SpongeBob SquarePants Stephen Hillenburg and Creative leader of Marvel Comics Stan Lee both die in November.
November 30, 2018 – Former U.S. President George H. W. Bush dies from complications resulting from Parkinson's disease. He lies in the state at the U.S. Capitol building before being interred.
2019 – All the works published in 1923 except for sound recordings (2022 scheduled events) enter the public domain in the United States.
January 1, 2019 – Washington bans all persons under 21 years of age from purchasing a semi-automatic rifle.
January 25, 2019 – The longest government shutdown in American history, which lasts from December 22, 2018 to January 25, 2019 (35 days), officially ends.
January 30, 2019 – Large portions of the United States are hit with a polar vortex. The city of Chicago once again hit a record low: 27 degrees below zero. It occurred for fifty-two straight hours.
February 1, 2019 – President Donald Trump confirms that the U.S. will leave the Intermediate-range Nuclear Forces Treaty.
2019 – Mexican drug boss/lord Joaquín "El Chapo" Guzmán is found guilty on all ten counts at a drug-trafficking trial in New York.
February 22, 2019 – Singer R. Kelly charged with ten counts of aggravated criminal sexual abuse for incidents dating back as far as the year 1998.
February 27, 2019 – 2019 North Korea – United States Hanoi Summit held in Vietnam. It is the second summit between U.S. President Donald Trump and North Korean leader Kim Jong-un. 
March 26, 2019 – Vice President Mike Pence orders NASA to fly Americans to the Moon within the next five years, using either government or private carriers.
2019 –The  Supreme Court case Bucklew V. Precythe rules 5 to 4 that inmates on death row are not guaranteed "painless executions"  under the Constitution.
April 4, 2019 – The 1973 War Powers Act Resolution is invoked for the first time when the House of Representatives votes 247–175 to end U.S. military assistance in Saudi Arabia in its intervention in the Yemeni Civil War. 
April 2019 – The first image of a black hole is taken.
April 2019 – James Earl Carter Jr. becomes the longest ever living U.S. president at 94 years old, following the death of George H. W. Bush in December 2018.
April 27, 2019 – A gunman kills one and injures three in a California Synagogue. The suspect is white supremacist John Timothy Earnest, who was 19 years old at the time.
May 31, 2019 – A city employee for Virginia Beach enters a municipal building with a gun and kills 12 people.
June 8, 2019 – President Trump reaches an agreement with Mexico to avoid tariffs.
June 9, 2019 – A construction crane falls on an apartment complex in Dallas, killing 1 person and injuring 6.
June 14, 2019 – One person dies and two more are injured after a gunman entered a Costco in Southern California.
July 26, 2019 – The Supreme Court rules in a 5–4 vote to give President Trump $2.5 billion to fund his wall. 
August 3, 2019 – 23 people are killed and another 23 are injured in a mass shooting at a Walmart in El Paso, Texas.
August 4, 2019 – A gunman opens fire on a bar in Dayton, Ohio. He kills nine people and injures another 27.
August 10, 2019 – Financier and convicted sex offender Jeffrey Epstein is found dead in his prison cell under mysterious circumstances. It was declared a suicide by hanging, although the ruling is widely disputed.
August 12, 2019 – An anonymous whistleblower filed a complaint against Donald Trump and Rudy Giuliani, claiming that the two sought foreign intervention in the 2020 presidential election. This complaint would lead to an investigation into the Trump-Ukraine scandal. 
September 24, 2019 – Speaker of the House Nancy Pelosi announces the House of Representatives would begin an impeachment inquiry against Donald Trump.
December 18, 2019 – The U.S. House of Representatives impeaches President Trump for high crimes and misdemeanors.

2020s

January 3, 2020 – President Donald Trump approves the targeted killing of Iranian general Qasem Soleimani and Iraqi paramilitary leader Abu Mahdi al-Muhandis in Baghdad, Iraq.
January 16, 2020 – The first impeachment trial of President Donald Trump begins in the U.S. Senate.
January 21, 2020 – The first patient in the United States is diagnosed with coronavirus.
January 26, 2020 – Kobe Bryant, along with his daughter, Gianna, and 7 others, perish in a helicopter crash.
February 5, 2020 – The majority of the United States Senate votes to acquit Donald Trump of charges related to the Trump-Ukraine scandal.
February 24, 2020 – Former film producer Harvey Weinstein is found guilty of rape.
February 26, 2020 – 6 people are killed in a mass shooting in Milwaukee, Wisconsin before the perpetrator killed himself.
February 29, 2020 – The Trump administration and the Taliban sign a conditional peace agreement in Doha, Qatar as part of a process to end the War in Afghanistan.
March 3, 2020 – Super Tuesday 2020 takes place.
March 5, 2020 – The U.S. Senate approves an $8.3 billion federal emergency aid package in response to the COVID-19 pandemic.
March 11, 2020 – The World Health Organization officially declares COVID-19 a global pandemic.
March 13, 2020 – President Trump declares a national emergency in response to the COVID-19 pandemic, freeing up $50 billion in disaster relief funds.
March 16, 2020 – The Dow Jones falls by −2,997.10, the single largest point drop in history and the second largest percentage drop ever at −12.93%, a larger crash than the Wall Street Crash of 1929. Most schools are also closed by this date.
March 18, 2020 – President Trump signs the Families First Coronavirus Response Act into law and announces he will invoke the Defense Production Act to improve U.S. medical resources as well as directing the Housing and Urban Development Department (HUD) to suspend evictions and foreclosures of federal housing until the end of April.
March 24, 2020 – The U.S. box office records zero revenue for the first time ever.
March 26, 2020 – The Trump administration indicts Venezuelan president Nicolás Maduro's government of drug trafficking and narcoterrorism and offers a $15 million reward for information leading to Maduro's arrest.
March 27, 2020 – President Trump signs the CARES Act in response to the COVID-19 pandemic.
April 8, 2020 – Senator Bernie Sanders suspends his presidential campaign, leaving Joe Biden as the presumptive Democratic nominee.
April 11, 2020 – The U.S. becomes the country with the highest number of reported COVID-19 deaths: over 20,000, overtaking Italy.
April 14, 2020 – President Trump announces that he will suspend U.S. funding of the World Health Organization (WHO) pending an investigation into its early response to the outbreak.
April 15, 2020 – Michigan governor Gretchen Whitmer faces two federal lawsuits accusing her of violating constitutional rights during the state's containment efforts. Thousands of people attend a protest in Lansing as anti-lockdown sentiment spreads.
April 16, 2020 – It is revealed that nearly 22 million Americans have filed for unemployment within a single month due to COVID-19 lockdowns, the worst unemployment crisis since the Great Depression.
April 21, 2020 –  Oil prices reach a record low, falling into negative values, due to the ongoing COVID-19 pandemic and the Russia–Saudi Arabia oil price war.
April 27, 2020 – The US Pentagon releases three UFO videos.
April 30, 2020 – Armed protesters enter the Michigan State Capitol building to demand an end to lockdown measures.
May 15, 2020 – The Trump administration formally announces Operation Warp Speed, a public–private partnership for accelerating the development of a COVID-19 vaccine.
May 25, 2020 – George Floyd, an African-American man living in Minneapolis, is murdered by Derek Chauvin, who kneeled on his neck during an arrest. Subsequently, nationwide protests ensued.
August 28, 2020 – Actor Chadwick Boseman passes away from colon cancer.
May 27, 2020 – The official nationwide COVID-19 death toll surpasses 100,000—more Americans than were killed in the Vietnam and Korean wars combined, and approaching that of the First World War, when more than 116,000 Americans died in combat.
September 18, 2020 – Supreme Court Justice Ruth Bader Ginsburg dies.
October 2, 2020 – President Donald Trump and First Lady Melania Trump are diagnosed with COVID-19. The former is taken to Walter Reed hospital.
October 8, 2020 – The FBI announces that thirteen men have been arrested for plotting to kidnap Gretchen Whitmer.
November 3, 2020 – U.S. presidential election, 2020
November 7, 2020 – Four days after election day, former Vice President Joe Biden is elected the 46th president, defeating Donald Trump. Biden's running mate, Kamala Harris, is elected the 49th vice president, becoming the first woman to hold that office.
December 14, 2020 – The first doses of the Pfizer COVID-19 vaccine are given out in the United States.
January 6, 2021 – Trump-supporting rioters storm the United States Capitol, forcing Congress to evacuate and interrupting the Electoral College vote count that certified Joe Biden's victory.
January 13, 2021 – Trump becomes the only president to be impeached for a second time. Ten Republicans join all Senate Democrats in voting to impeach Trump.

Presidency of Joe Biden

January 20, 2021 – Joe Biden becomes the 46th president and Kamala Harris becomes the 49th vice president. Harris is the first woman to hold her office.
President Biden signs his first executive orders reversing several Trump administration actions, including rejoining the Paris Agreement and the World Health Organization, repealing the 2017 travel bans, ending funding for the United States–Mexico border wall, and revoking the permit for the Keystone XL pipeline.
February 13, 2021 – Donald Trump is acquitted by the Senate in his second impeachment trial. Seven Republicans joined Democrats in voting to convict Trump.
February 13–17 – A major winter storm kills 58 people in the United States (and 12 in Mexico) and causes over 9,724,000 power outages across 13 states in the Midwest and Southwest, with Southwest Power Pool declaring an "energy emergency".
February 15 – House Speaker Nancy Pelosi announces that Congress will establish a 9/11-styled commission to investigate the January 6 riot at the United States Capitol.
March 7, 2021 – Floods in Hawaii leave one missing, destroy six homes, force evacuations, and leave 1,300 without electricity.
March 11, 2021 – American Rescue Plan Act of 2021 is passed.
March 16, 2021 – A spa shooting in Atlanta leaves 8 dead; 6 of the victims were of Asian descent.
March 22, 2021 – Ten people are killed in a mass shooting at a King Soopers location in Boulder, Colorado. This is the second mass shooting with at least 8 dead in a week.
March 31, 2021 – Four people are killed and two others, including the suspect, are injured in a shooting at an office building in Orange, California.
April 2, 2021 – The Capitol Building in Washington, D.C. is placed under lockdown after a suspect rams a car into a barricade on Constitution Avenue and exits the vehicle holding a knife. Two police officers are injured in the attack and taken to a hospital, where one dies from his injuries. The suspect is killed by Capitol Police.
April 2021 – January 2022 – Arizona's Maricopa County conducts an audit of the 2020 presidential election ballots, claiming election fraud.
April 7, 2021 – Six people are killed by gunshots at a house in Rock Hill, South Carolina. The shooter, former NFL cornerback Phillip Adams, later committed suicide.
April 15, 2021 – Nine people are killed, including the shooter, and seven injured, in a mass shooting at a FedEx facility in Indianapolis.
May 9, 2021 – Seven people are shot dead at a birthday party in Colorado Springs, Colorado.
May 26, 2021 – A mass shooting occurs at a Santa Clara Valley Transportation Authority rail yard in San Jose, California, leaving ten people dead, including the gunman, who committed suicide.
June 17, 2021 – Juneteenth National Independence Day Act is passed, making Juneteenth a federal holiday.
June 24, 2021 – A condominium in Miami collapses, killing ninety-eight people and injuring eleven others.
August 10, 2021 – New York Governor Andrew Cuomo announces he will resign effective August 24 after an inquiry found he sexually harassed multiple women.
August 30, 2021 – The United States withdraws its remaining troops from Afghanistan, ending its 20-year involvement in the War in Afghanistan.
October 13, 2021 – Star Trek actor William Shatner becomes the oldest person to go into space, at age 90, on board the Blue Origin NS-18, launched from Texas.
November 5, 2021 – A crowd crush during a Travis Scott concert at the Astroworld Festival in Houston kills ten people and injures more than 300.
November 15, 2021 – The Infrastructure Investment and Jobs Act is signed into law.
November 17, 2021 – The U.S. House of Representatives votes 223–207 to censure Rep. Paul Gosar (R–AZ) after he posted a photo-shopped anime clip of him killing Rep. Alexandria Ocasio-Cortez (D–NY) and threatening President Biden, making him the first lawmaker to be censured since Charlie Rangel in 2010.
November 30, 2021 – Four students are killed and seven other people are injured in a mass shooting at Oxford High School in Oxford Township, Michigan.
December 10, 2021 – A late season tornado outbreak occurs in the Southern and Midwestern United States, causing major damage and killing at least 94 people.
December 29, 2021 – British socialite Ghislaine Maxwell is convicted in a federal court on five of six charges relating to her recruiting and trafficking young girls to be sexually abused by the late financier Jeffrey Epstein.
May 24, 2022 – A school shooting in Uvalde, Texas kills 19 students and two teachers.
June 24, 2022 – Roe v. Wade is overturned by the Supreme Court.
November 2022 – In the 2022 United States elections, the Republicans retake the House while the Democrats keep the Senate.
January 2023 – Kevin McCarthy is elected speaker of the House of Representatives on the fifteenth ballot.

See also
 History of the United States (1991–2008)
 History of the United States (2008–present)

References

External links
 

2010

United States

United States